Chateau Chevalier, at 3101 Spring Mountain Rd. in St. Helena, California in Napa Valley, was built in 1891.  It was listed on the National Register of Historic Places in 1987.

It was built for French immigrant and wine importer Fortune Chevalier.  It reflects the "wine boom" era in Napa County, after phylloxera destroyed numerous vineyards in France, Europe.

The Chateau Chevalier Wine Cellar,  in plan, is a two-story stone building stepped into the hillside.

The listing included a second contributing building, a carriage house.

See also
Chateau Pacheteau (1906), in Calistoga

References

Châteauesque architecture in the United States
National Register of Historic Places in Napa County, California
Buildings and structures completed in 1891